Yoshimitsu is a name used by several video game player characters, first appearing in the original Tekken and Soulcalibur series of fighting games by Namco.

Yoshimitsu may also refer to:

People 
 Yoshimitsu Abe (1868–1969)
, Japanese boxer
 Yoshimitsu Banno (1931–2017)
, Japanese golfer
, Japanese bobsledder
 Yoshimitsu Morita (1950–2011)
, Japanese weightlifter
 Yoshimitsu Shimoyama (born 1976)
 Yoshimitsu Takashima (born 1941)
 Yoshimitsu Yamada (born 1938)
 Ashikaga Yoshimitsu (1358–1408), the Muromachi shōgun 
 Minamoto no Yoshimitsu (1045–1127), the Heian period samurai

Characters 
Yoshimitsu, a character in Senran Kagura: New Wave

Japanese masculine given names